Alexandre Holroyd (born 17 May 1987) is a Swiss-born French-British politician.

Holroyd was the candidate of La République En Marche! at the 2017 legislative elections for the third constituency for French residents overseas. He won the second round against former Hollande minister Axelle Lemaire on 18 June 2017.

Early life and education
Holroyd is half British and half French. He was educated at the Lycée Français Charles de Gaulle, a school in South Kensington in London, followed by King's College London, the London School of Economics and the French Sciences Po,  (also known as the Paris Institute of Political Studies).

Upon graduation, Holroyd worked with FTI Consulting in Brussels and later London.

Political career
Holroyd left his job to found the En Marche! movement in London, a few weeks after the British vote on Brexit. 

Since 19 June 2017, Holroyd has been serving as a deputy of the French National Assembly, representing Northern Europe.

From 2017 until 2020, Holroyd served on the Finance Committee of the French Parliament. Since 2020, he has been a member of the Committee on Foreign Affairs and the Committee on European Affairs.

In addition to his committee assignments, Holroyd is part of the French Parliamentary Friendship Group with the United Kingdom. Since 2019, he has also been a member of the French delegation to the Franco-German Parliamentary Assembly.

Political positions
In July 2019, Holroyd voted in favour of the French ratification of the European Union’s Comprehensive Economic and Trade Agreement (CETA) with Canada.

References

1987 births
Living people
Alumni of King's College London
La République En Marche! politicians
Deputies of the 15th National Assembly of the French Fifth Republic
English people of French descent
French people of English descent
Swiss people of English descent
Swiss people of French descent
Politicians from Basel-Stadt
People educated at Lycée Français Charles de Gaulle
Members of Parliament for French people living outside France